For the felony murder rule in all U.S. jurisdictions, see felony murder rule.

In the state of Virginia, the common law felony murder rule is codified at Code of Virginia §§ 18.2-32, 18.2-33. This rule provides that anyone who kills another human being during the perpetration or attempted perpetration of arson, rape, forcible sodomy, inanimate or animate object sexual penetration, robbery, burglary or abduction is guilty of first degree murder.

See also
 Law of Virginia

References

U.S. state criminal law
Virginia law
Murder in Virginia